Hansberry may refer to:
 Carl Augustus Hansberry (1895–1946), American real estate broker and political activist
 Lorraine Hansberry, American playwright, author of A Raisin in the Sun, the first play written by a black woman to be produced on Broadway
 Hansberry v. Lee, a 1940 U.S. Supreme Court decision that dealt with a racially restrictive covenant